Legend of the Sacred Stone is a 2000 Taiwanese puppetry feature film written and directed by Chris Huang, a spin-off from the glove puppetry wuxia television series Pili. It reflects the traditional Taiwanese style of glove puppetry known there as budaixi, supplemented by computer-generated imagery.

Plot
Throughout the storyline within this movie film, 400 years within the past is where it is meant to be taking place. The story begins when a man by the name of Mo Kuei threatens the people to the extent that he will destroy all of Wulin, which had been the forest of residence for the warriors of Wulin. A certain sage by the name of Su Huan-jen had responded to this conflict by summoning three specific warriors from different schools of martial arts to assist him. These three warriors would then wait within ambush for Mo Kuei to gather his spiritual energy amongst the summit of the mountain. The story continues onward in which Lord Jian almost becomes sealed by certain protectors of Wulin. Many conflicts follow this in which Jian loses all of his powers and lusts to find the Sacred Stone to regain his powers.

Character List
Main characters
 Su Huan-Jen
 Ao Hsiao Hong-Chen
 Ching Yanz-zi
 Jian Ru-Bing
 Lord Jian

Other characters
 Mo-Kui
 Jian Wei
 Jian Wu-Yan
 Jian Jun
 Kwuang Dao
 Hsiao-Chai
 enemy demons

Character Biographies
Su Huan-Jen: The main character within the Legend of the Sacred Stone film. Huan-Jen was regularly referred to as White Lotus through his purity of mind and character. No matter how extreme of circumstances, Huan-Jen will always reflect calmness within his art of the sword and inner mind even when he consists of merely one arm. Huan-Jen is renowned for his excelled abilities with his sword. Huan-Jen also reflects various traits such as being clever within his tactics and rather wise. His ultimate goal is to restore Wulin to its former power even if it costs him his life in the process. Huan-Jen later vows to destroy Lord Jian after he sees his brother dead right before him.

Ao Hsiao Hong-Chen: The primary subordinate character within Legend of the Sacred Stone. Hong-Chen had been an old friend of Lord Jian. The many unforeseen events within his life, such as his friend becoming rather distorted of mind has led for him to have no true desire towards political power. Through this, Hong-Chen has searched for many years towards a more pure way with the world. After some years had passed by, he soon became rather obsessed with spiritual power, and a rather strong sense of justice. However, Hong-Chen can act impulsively at times when his sense of justice is challenged in any type of way. It is noted that Hong-Chen is even a greater swordsman than that of Su Huan-Jen which was proved through a certain serious duel to the death between each other.

Ching Yang-Zi: A very close friend to that of Su Huan-Jen. He is always with Huan-Jen, and they regularly call each other brothers due to their closeness. Yang-Zi possesses a certain unique ability with the harp weapon, in which he can transmit spiritual power and use at will within battle. It is also known that Yang-Zi is brave of heart and is a rather noted gentleman. At one time within the story, Yang-Zi attempts to flee with Ru-Bing in hopes of escaping the demon allies of Lord Jian. After Yang-Zi is severely wounded and near death, he had kept continuing to protect Ru-Bing for the sake of his brother. However, after he made a secure rout of escape for Ru-Bing, he would see his last against three specific demons, in which he had violently unleashed his powers amongst the melee. Yang-Zi however was dealt the final slash by the enemy, in which he stood alone with blood rushing forth from his body, never to wake again.

Jian Ru-Bing: A rather beautiful woman who had been well known as the daughter of Lord Jian. Ru-Bing is daily forced to carry around her father's hatred towards their past village. Ru-Bing's actions, which are partially driven through fear, result in her acting in any way that complies with her father. Ru-Bing even went to  the extent as to attempt to retrieve the Sacred Stone from Hell's Valley to restore her father's face, and spiritual power. Ru-Bing is also the secret love of Su Huan-Jen. In the end however, Ru-Bing sadly sacrifices her life to the Sacred Stone so that her father can become restored. This is because the Sacred Stone requires an equal sacrifice to attain a greater goal.

Lord Jian: The primary villain within the Legend of the Sacred Stone, and father of Ru-Bing. Jian had at one time been noted as a kind man of noble descent, even to the extent that he was known as the "Great Protector". Later however, his younger brother would find a certain artifact known as the Sacred Stone, which caused many demons to attack him (in which is where his face became ruined) and to have his whole family slaughtered. This caused for a large distortion within Jian, leading for him to possess an immense blood lust. Jian will stop at nothing to fin the Sacred Stone for revenge, even if it costs him being sealed away or killed. Jian's hatred leads for him to become enemies with the warriors of Wulin, even leading for many to be recruited to act against him. His ultimate goal is to restore his face and attain unlimited power, even if it costs his daughter's death. In the end however, his daughter is sacrificed, and he is finally defeated after a long battle against both Su Huan-Jen and Hsiao Hong-Chen.

Jian Wei: The sworn protector of Lord Jian. Jian Wei had served as Jian's protector even at a young age, and will continue to serve him even if he had become distorted of mind. However, Jian Wei still wishes for Lord Jian to return to his old self and will stop at nothing to see his true master's self again. Later within the story, Jian Wei runs away with Ru-Bing when he acquires the Sacred Stone, as to save Lord Jian from his ambition. Jian later catches up with Jian Wei and slays him without a second thought.

Technique
The techniques used in Legend of the Sacred Stone and the Pili TV series are glove puppetry, CG animation, and wires are sometimes used when characters are fighting to flip them around in the air. Unlike other hand puppets, budaixi puppets have legs.

DVD versions
There are two versions of the film on DVD - the uncut 120-minute version from Taiwan, which has no English subtitles, and the truncated 99-minute version from Japan, with English subtitles. The Japanese DVDs advertise a "129-minute" running time, but this includes the special features.

External links
Official Web site

2000 films
Puppet films
Glove puppetry
Taiwanese martial arts films
Wuxia films